The 1988–89 season of the Moroccan Throne Cup was the 33rd edition of the competition.

Wydad Athletic Club won the competition, beating Olympique de Khouribga 2–0 in the final, played at the Prince Moulay Abdellah Stadium in Rabat. Wydad Athletic Club won the cup for the 5th time in their history.

Competition

Last 16

Quarter-finals

Semi-finals

Final 
The final took place between the two winning semi-finalists, Wydad Athletic Club and Olympique de Khouribga, on 6 March 1989 at the Prince Moulay Abdellah Stadium in Rabat.

Notes and references 

1988
1988 in association football
1989 in association football
1988–89 in Moroccan football